is a platform game developed and published by Riot for the Super Famicom and released in 1992. Riot was a division of Telenet Japan.

Gameplay

The player takes control of either Ryō or Maria. Ryō is a swordsman while Maria is an angelic warrior who uses a whip that can be upgraded into metal claws or a laser gun. Demons can even be summoned to destroy most of the monsters on the screen. Many of the stages are set against the backdrop of 20th century Japan.

Having a limited amount of time to defeat enemies, the focus is on advancing through the stages as quickly as possible.

Plot
In the early 1980s, rumors begin to circulate about a new entertainment medium called "D Movie", which allows people to immerse themselves in a world of virtual reality. As D Movies gain traction, a trend emerges of disaffected young people taking permanent refuge in the virtual world while abandoning their physical bodies to atrophy. To retrieve these so-called "Sinkers", Japan's National Public Safety Commission establishes , nicknamed , in 1984. The agents who enter the virtual world and perform these rescues are known as Debuggers.

In 1992, a seventeen-year-old girl named  sinks into , a D Movie directed by David Visconti. Three days pass before she is discovered, and combined with her weak constitution, she is expected to die within twenty-four hours. Two Debuggers, Ryō Shijima and Maria Tobari, are dispatched to rescue her before that happens.

Development and release
Psycho Dream was directed by Kenichi Nishi. It was released in Japan on the Super Famicom on December 11, 1992. A North American localization was planned by Telenet Japan subsidiary Renovation Products, but it was never released. It would have been their second release following Doomsday Warrior. In their 1994 SNES catalog, Nintendo Power mistakenly listed Dream Probe as having been released in September 1993.

Psycho Dream was made available through Nintendo Switch Online on February 17, 2021.

Reception 

Famitsu gave it an 18/40. Fan reception was mixed: readers of Famimaga voted to give the game a 17.43 out of 30 score, ranking at the number 292 spot in a poll, indicating a middling following. Reviewing the planned localization, three reviewers at Electronic Gaming Monthly gave a score of 5/10 and a fourth gave a 6/10. Super Play gave the game a 33% score. Italian magazine Game Power gave it 75%.

Notes

References

External links
Psycho Dream at MobyGames

1992 video games
Japan-exclusive video games
Platform games
Side-scrolling video games
Super Nintendo Entertainment System games
Video games featuring female protagonists
Video games developed in Japan
Video games scored by Michiko Naruke
Video games set in Japan
Video games about virtual reality
Single-player video games
Nintendo Switch Online games